The Association of Independent Schools of Greater Washington (AISGW) is an association of 75 independent schools located in the District of Columbia and metropolitan Washington, D.C. areas in Virginia and Maryland. More than 30,000 students attend these member schools in grades pre-K through high school.

Founded in 1951, AISGW member schools include co-ed schools as well as boys- and girls-only programs. Headquartered in Washington, D.C., with a staff of three full-time employees, AISGW serves as a resource for member schools and families seeking to learn more about independent education and the educational options provided by its member schools.

The mission of AISGW is to advance the collective interests of member schools in the capital region by promoting high professional standards and exemplary practices, encouraging cooperative endeavors, enhancing member schools' standing in the community, and safeguarding their independence.

Programs 
AISGW provides advocacy for its member schools, both on legislative and regulatory issues and to the public in advocating and communicating the benefits of an independent school education. The Association also provides tools for schools to use, opportunities for networking and professional development for administrators and school leaders, sponsors recruiting fairs, and provides educational benefits for member schools and their faculty and staff.

The Association manages a job bank where it lists open positions at its member schools and provides yearly statistical analysis of trends in enrollment, tuition, and other topics.

Membership 
Membership is available to independent, 501(c)(3) schools within the AISGW service area who have independent boards of trustees and independent finances, are accredited by a nationally recognized accrediting board (i.e. Virginia Association of Independent Schools, the National Association for the Education of Young Children, the Middle States Association of Colleges and Schools, the Association of Independent Schools of Maryland and DC, the Southern Association of Independent Schools, and have been in operation for 36 consecutive months. Provisional memberships are also available.

District of Columbia

 Aidan Montessori School
Beauvoir, The National Cathedral Elementary School
 Bishop John T. Walker School For Boys
 Capitol Hill Day School
Edmund Burke School
The Field School
Georgetown Day School
Georgetown Visitation Preparatory School
Gonzaga College High School
 The Lab School of Washington
Lowell School
Maret School
Milton Gottesman Jewish Day School of the Nation's Capital
National Cathedral School
 National Child Research Center
 National Presbyterian School
Parkmont School
 The River School
Sheridan School
Sidwell Friends School
St. Albans School
St. Anselm's Abbey School
 St. Columba's Nursery School
St. John's College High School
St. Patrick's Episcopal Day School
Washington International School
 Washington Jesuit Academy
 The Washington School For Girls

Maryland
 Alef Bet Montessori School
The Academy of The Holy Cross
 Barrie School 
 Bullis School 
 Butler Montessori 
 Charles E. Smith Jewish Day School 
 Concord Hill School
 Connelly School of the Holy Child
 The Diener School
 Evergreen School
 Georgetown Preparatory School
German International School Washington, DC
 Grace Episcopal Day School
 Green Acres School
 The Harbor School
 The Heights School
 Holton-Arms School
 Landon School
 Mater Dei School
 McLean School of Maryland
The Nora School
 Norwood School 
 The Primary Day School 
 St. Andrew's Episcopal School
Stone Ridge School of the Sacred Heart
The Tidewater School
 Washington Episcopal School
 Washington Waldorf School
 The Woods Academy

Virginia

Browne Academy
 Burgundy Farm Country Day School 
 Commonwealth Academy
 The Congressional School of Virginia
 Episcopal High School 
 Flint Hill School 
 Foxcroft School 
 Grace Episcopal School
 Green Hedges School
 The Hill School 
 The Langley School 
 Loudoun Country Day School 
 The Madeira School
 Oakwood School
 The Potomac School 
 St. Stephens & St. Agnes School 
 Westminster School

References

External links 
 Official website

1951 establishments in Washington, D.C.
Education in Washington, D.C.
Educational institutions established in 1951
Private and independent school organizations in the United States
Non-profit organizations based in Washington, D.C.
501(c)(3) organizations